The Bhishti (Hindustani: भिश्ती, بهِشتی) are a Muslim  tribe or  found in North India and Pakistan.

History and origin
They are classified as Ajlaf in the South Asian Muslim caste system.

The bhisti are knows as Abbasi or Sheikh Abbasi and Saqqa.The Sheikh Abbasi belong to arab tribe (Banu_Abbas).People of India Uttar Pradesh Volume XLII edited by A. Hasan & J. C. Das page 285
Chisholm, Hugh, ed. (1911). "Bheesty" . Encyclopædia Britannica. 3 (11th ed.). Cambridge University Press. p. 845<refPeople of India Uttar Pradesh Volume XLII edited by A. Hasan & J. C. Das page 285
Chisholm, Hugh, ed. (1911). "Bheesty" . Encyclopædia Britannica. 3 (11th ed.). Cambridge University Press. p. 845></ref>

References

Islam in Delhi
Indian castes
Social groups of Uttar Pradesh
Muslim communities of India
Shaikh clans
Social groups of Delhi
Muslim communities of Uttar Pradesh
Muslim communities of Gujarat
Social groups of Gujarat
Social groups of Maharashtra
Muslim communities of Maharashtra
Tribes of Asia
Tribes of Pakistan
Tribes of India

{).People of India Uttar Pradesh Volume XLII edited by A. Hasan & J. C. Das page 285

Chisholm, Hugh, ed. (1911). "Bheesty" . Encyclopædia Britannica. 3 (11th ed.). Cambridge University Press. p. 845<refPeople of India Uttar Pradesh Volume XLII edited by A. Hasan & J. C. Das page 285
Chisholm, Hugh, ed. (1911). "Bheesty" . Encyclopædia Britannica. 3 (11th ed.). Cambridge University Press. p. 845></ref>{Pakistan-ethno-st